Affie may refer to:
 Affie Ellis, American politician
 Affie Jarvis (1860–1933), Australian wicket-keeper
 Alfred, Duke of Saxe-Coburg and Gotha (1844–1900), nicknamed "Affie"

See also
 Alfred (disambiguation)